Maia Airport  is an airport serving Maia in northern Portugal.

The runway has a  displaced threshold on each end.

See also
Transport in Portugal
List of airports in Portugal

References

 OurAirports - Maia
 Great Circle Mapper - Maia
 Google Earth

Airports in Portugal